West Portal and 14th Avenue is a light rail stop on the Muni Metro K Ingleside and M Ocean View lines, located in the West Portal neighborhood of San Francisco, California. The station opened along with the Twin Peaks Tunnel and the first stage of the K Ingleside line (to St. Francis Circle) on February 3, 1918.

The stop has two low-level side platforms (traffic islands) located before the cross street. It is the only non-accessible stop between St. Francis Circle to the west and the downtown stations to the east.

References

External links 

SFMTA – West Portal and 14th Avenue inbound and outbound
SFBay Transit (unofficial) – West Portal Ave & 14th Ave

Muni Metro stations
Railway stations in the United States opened in 1918